Harry Turpin Stadium is a 15,971-seat multi-purpose stadium in Natchitoches, Louisiana. It opened in 1975 and is home to the Northwestern State University Demons football team.

History
Donald Gray Horton (1945–2013), a Coushatta lawyer and philanthropist who served as the long-term president of the NSU Athletic Association, formulated the establishment in 2003 of the innovative Demon Alley tailgating zone south of Turpin Stadium. The zone is equipped with utility connections, including cable television.

Top 10 crowds
1.  17,528  Southern Jaguars                                                      09/02/00
2.  17,031  McNeese State Cowboys                                            11/16/02
3.  16,706  Southern Jaguars                                                      09/05/98
4.  16,222  Southern Jaguars                                                      09/07/96
5.  15,600  Southern Jaguars                                                      09/03/93
6.  14,873  Southern Jaguars                                                      09/07/13
7.  14,591  McNeese State Cowboys                                            10/16/04
8.  14,586  McNeese State Cowboys                                            10/22/00
9.  14,436  Tarleton State Texans                                            09/18/99
10. 14,247  McNeese State Cowboys                                            10/15/98

Gallery

See also
List of NCAA Division I FCS football stadiums

References

External links
Turpin Stadium - Northwestern State Athletics

American football venues in Louisiana
College football venues
Multi-purpose stadiums in the United States
Northwestern State Demons football
Sports venues in Natchitoches, Louisiana
Buildings and structures in Natchitoches, Louisiana